East Chain is an unincorporated community in East Chain Township, Martin County, Minnesota, United States.

Notes

Unincorporated communities in Martin County, Minnesota
Unincorporated communities in Minnesota